The following lists events that happened during 1930 in Australia.

Incumbents

Monarch – George V
Governor-General – John Baird, Baronet of Stonehaven
Prime Minister – James Scullin
Chief Justice – Adrian Knox (until 18 March) then Isaac Isaacs

State premiers
Premier of New South Wales – Thomas Bavin (until 4 November), then Jack Lang
Premier of Queensland – Arthur Edward Moore
Premier of South Australia – Richard Layton Butler (until 17 April), then Lionel Hill
Premier of Tasmania – John McPhee
Premier of Victoria – Edmond Hogan
Premier of Western Australia – Philip Collier (until 24 April), then Sir James Mitchell

State governors
Governor of New South Wales – Sir Dudley de Chair
Governor of Queensland – Sir John Goodwin
Governor of South Australia – Sir Alexander Hore-Ruthven
Governor of Tasmania – Sir James O'Grady
Governor of Victoria – Arthur Somers-Cocks, 6th Baron Somers
Governor of Western Australia – Sir William Campion

Events

 11 November – The Shrine of Remembrance in Brisbane is dedicated.

Arts and literature

Sport
6 January – Don Bradman scores a record 452 not out in one cricket innings.
25 January – Harry Hopman and Jack Crawford win the Australian Doubles Championship at Kooyong, Victoria.
4 October - The 1930 NSWRFL season culminates in Western Suburbs' 27–2 victory over St. George in the premiership final, marking Western Suburbs' first premiership since the club was founded in 1908.
11 October - The VFL Grand Final was won by the Collingwood Football Club, defeating the Geelong Football Club by 30 points, establishing an as yet unbeaten record in consecutive premierships in Australian Rules football's premier league.,
4 November – Phar Lap wins the Melbourne Cup.
The Australia national rugby league team completed the 1929–30 Kangaroo tour of Great Britain.

Births

January - February 

 11 January
 Ron Mulock, 10th Deputy Premier of New South Wales (d. 2014)
 Rod Taylor, actor (d. 2015)
 12 January – Ewan Cameron, Victorian politician
 19 January – Don Kendell, businessman (d. 2001)
 21 January – Arthur Tonkin, Western Australian politician
 23 January – Mervyn Rose, tennis player (d. 2017)
 26 January – Richard Killen, New South Wales politician (d. 2012)
 28 January – A. David Buckingham, chemist (d. 2021)
 9 February – Robert Bropho, Indigenous rights activist and convicted sex offender (d. 2011)
 12 February – Jim Ramsay, Victorian politician (d. 2013)
 15 February – Bruce Dawe, poet (d. 2020)
 21 February – Elsa Klensch, journalist and television presenter (d. 2022)
 22 February – Max Smith, New South Wales politician
 26 February – Les McMahon, New South Wales politician (d. 2015)
 27 February – Joe Riordan, New South Wales politician (d. 2012)
 27 February – Diane Holland, actress (d. 2009)

March - April 

 1 March – Doris Goddard, cabaret singer and actress (d. 2019)
 4 March – John Toohey, High Court justice (d. 2015)
 5 March – John Miles, Victorian politician (d. 2010)
 11 March – Geoffrey Blainey, historian
 18 March – Joan Chambers, Victorian politician (d. 2016)
 19 March – Pat Hanlon, Queensland politician (d. 2014)
 23 March – Owen Harries, academic and magazine editor (born in the United Kingdom) (d. 2020)
 29 March – John Marshall, Olympic swimmer (d. 1957)
 30 March – Rolf Harris, entertainer, musician and convicted sex offender
 5 April – Bob Fell, Victorian politician
 11 April
 John Hyde, Australian rules footballer (Geelong) (d. 2020)
 Peter Toogood, golfer (d. 2019)
 12 April
 John Landy, 26th Governor of Victoria and Olympic athlete (d. 2022)
 Nancy Lyons, Olympic swimmer 
 13 April – Dorothy Isaksen, New South Wales politician
 14 April – Kevin Humphreys, rugby league player (d. 2010)
 20 April – Gordon Hamilton Fairley, surgeon and oncologist (d. 1975)
 24 April – Ken Muggleston, set decorator (d. 2021)

May - June 

 4 May – Colin Hughes, academic and public servant (born in The Bahamas) (d. 2017)
 7 May – Tom McVeigh, Queensland politician
 9 May – Bob Brown, motorcyclist (d. 1960)
 15 May – Haddon Storey, Victorian politician
 16 May – Brian Davies, rugby league footballer (d. 2012)
 21 May
 Malcolm Fraser, 22nd Prime Minister of Australia (d. 2015)
 Syd Slocomb, Australian rules footballer (St Kilda) (d. 2021)
 24 May
 Tony Bull, Australian rules footballer (Melbourne) (d. 2019)
 Barry Downs, Olympic sports shooter (d. 2020)
 30 May – Sever Sternhell, academic, and organic chemist (born in Poland) (d. 2022)
 9 June
 Terry Norris, Victorian politician and actor
 David Wordsworth, Western Australian politician (born in India)
 11 June – Neale Lavis, Olympic equestrian (d. 2019)
 12 June
 Jim Burke, cricketer (d. 1979)
 Dugald Munro, New South Wales politician (d. 1973)
 14 June – Lorna Fejo, member of the stolen generations (d. 2022)
 16 June – Malcolm Brooks, New South Wales politician (d. 2020)
 18 June – Roger Johnston, Victorian politician (d. 2020)
 25 June – Alf Hughes, Australian rules footballer (Hawthorn) (d. 2019)

July - August 

 1 July – Jack Hedley, Australian rules footballer (North Melbourne) (d. 2021)
 2 July – Ron Grey, senior army officer and commissioner of the Australian Federal Police (d. 2022)
 6 July
 Michael Baume, New South Wales politician
 Tom Hynd, Queensland politician (d. 2011)
 10 July
 Harold Allison, South Australian politician
 John Green, botanist
 14 July 
 Stan Evans, South Australian politician
 Ray Martini, Australian rules footballer
 17 July – Sir William Heseltine, Private Secretary to Queen Elizabeth II 
 18 July – Judy Gamin, Queensland politician (d. 2022)
 20 July – Bryan Conquest, Queensland politician (d. 2018)
 26 July – Johno Johnson, New South Wales politician (d. 2017)
 30 July
 Bobby Dimond, rugby league footballer (d. 2020)
 Al Lawrence, Olympic runner (d. 2017)
 31 July – John Freebairn, South Australian politician (d. 2016)
 2 August – Vali Myers, visionary artist, dancer, bohemian and muse (d. 2003)
 2 August – Peter Lehmann, wine producer (d. 2013)
 22 August – Brian Bannon, New South Wales politician (d. 2017)
 24 August – Paul Mooney, rugby union player (d. 2006)

September - October 

 9 September
 Francis Carroll, archbishop
 Lon Hatherell, rugby union player
 Jack Lihou, cricketer (d. 2021)
 11 September – Clifford Grant, operatic singer (d. 2021)
 22 September – Donald MacMillan, rugby union player (d. 1982)
 29 September – Richard Bonynge, conductor and pianist
 4 October – Keith Batchelor, Australian rules footballer (Collingwood and North Melbourne) (d. 2009)
 6 October – Richie Benaud, cricketer and commentator (d. 2015)
 11 October – Ian Foreman, Australian rules footballer (Footscray) (d. 2021)
 22 October – Sir Frank Lowy, businessman (born in Czechoslovakia)
 26 October – Shirley Abicair, actress, musician and author
 31 October – Bill Hewitt, Queensland politician (d. 2016)

November - December 

 14 November – Ray Land, Olympic sprinter (d. 2020)
 15 November – Ray Thorburn, New South Wales politician (d. 1986)
 18 November – Geoff Williams, Australian rules footballer (Geelong) (d. 2020)
 21 November – Eddie Stapleton, rugby union player (d. 2005)
 27 November – Dick Poole, rugby league player
 28 November – Kate Baxter, fencer (d. 2019) 
 29 November – Max Evans, Western Australian politician (d. 2019)
 30 November – John Newham, 16th Chief of the Air Staff
 1 December – Marie Bashir – 37th Governor of New South Wales
 3 December
 John Coulter, South Australian politician
 Daryl E. Hooper, electronic engineer (d. 1985)
 4 December – Sir Donald Trescowthick, businessman
 5 December – Lionel Cox, Olympic track cyclist (d. 2010)
 8 December
 June Craig, Western Australian politician
 Doug Ricketson, rugby league player (d. 2019)
 19 December – Richard Scotton, health economist (d. 2019)
 20 December – Noel Ferrier, actor (d. 1997)
 29 December – Lilliane Brady, Mayor of Cobar (d. 2021)
 31 December – Phil O'Brien, Australian rules footballer (Hawthorn) (d. 2020)

Deaths

 14 January – John Bisdee, military officer and Victoria Cross recipient (b. 1869)
 18 January – Brailsford Robertson, physiologist and biochemist (born in the United Kingdom) (b. 1884)
 3 March – Algernon Keith-Falconer, 9th Earl of Kintore, 12th Governor of South Australia (born and died in the United Kingdom) (d. 1852)
 19 March – Sir Henry Lefroy, 11th Premier of Western Australia  (b. 1854)
 22 April – John Russell, impressionist painter (b. 1858)
 21 May – Robert Cook, Victorian politician (b. 1867)
 27 May – Jethro Brown, jurist and professor of law (b. 1868)
 6 July – Margaret Francis Ellen Baskerville, sculptor, water colourist, and educator (b. 1861)
 27 July – George James Coates, artist (died in the United Kingdom) (b. 1869)
 20 August
 Charles Bannerman, cricketer (born in the United Kingdom) (b. 1851)
 John Brazier, malacologist (b. 1842)
 2 September – Archibald Strong, scholar and poet (b. 1876)
 11 September – William Carpenter, Western Australian politician (b. 1863)
 19 September – Sir Neville Howse, New South Wales politician, military officer and first Australian recipient of the Victoria Cross (born and died in the United Kingdom) (b. 1863)
 1 October 
 Albert Henry Fullwood, artist (born in the United Kingdom) (b. 1863)
 Sir James McCay, Victorian politician and soldier (born in Ireland) (b. 1864)
 30 October – John Creed, New South Wales politician and doctor (born in the United Kingdom) (b. 1842)
 13 November – Thomas Bulch, musician and composer (born in the United Kingdom) (b. 1862)
 14 November – Sandy Pearce, rugby league player (b. 1883)
 16 December – Octavius Beale, piano manufacturer and philanthropist (born in Ireland) (b. 1850)

See also
 List of Australian films of the 1930s

References

 
Australia
Years of the 20th century in Australia